Masada Anniversary Edition Vol. 4: Masada Recital is the fourth album in a series of five releases celebrating the 10th anniversary of John Zorn's Masada songbook project. It features 12 Masada songs performed by Sylvie Courvoisier on piano and Mark Feldman on violin.  It was released in 2004 on Zorn's Tzadik Records as part of the Radical Jewish Culture Series.

Reception
Allmusic music critic Sean Westergaard wrote "Each also brings a wealth of extended techniques to the proceedings, which helps the players to really make the songs their own. In fact, some listeners may be surprised that only piano and violin are being used, given the range of sounds and tones produced... A nice mix of inside and outside playing, Masada Recital is another winning entry in the ever-expanding catalog of Masada performances."

Track listing 
 "Kanah" – 4:15 
 "Socoh" – 3:46
 "Mahshav" – 5:39
 "Karet" – 2:05
 "Abidan" – 3:06
 "Malkhut" – 2:17*
 "Azekah" – 6:05
 "Nezikin" – 2:13
 "Karaim" – 8:55
 "Hath Arob" – 2:12
 "Aravot" – 3:47
 "Mahlah" – 4:52

All compositions by John Zorn.
Recorded at Hit Factory, New York City on February 17, 2004

 *misspelled as "Malkut" on album sleeve

Personnel 
 Sylvie Courvoisier – piano 
 Mark Feldman – violin

References 

2004 albums
Mark Feldman albums
Sylvie Courvoisier albums
Tzadik Records albums
Masada Anniversary albums
Albums produced by John Zorn